In Christian denominations that practice infant baptism, confirmation is seen as the sealing of the covenant created in baptism. Those being confirmed are known as confirmands. For adults, it is an affirmation of belief. It involves laying on of hands.

Catholicism views confirmation as a sacrament. The sacrament is called chrismation in the Eastern Christianity. In the East it is conferred immediately after baptism. In Western Christianity, confirmation is ordinarily administered when a child reaches the age of reason or early adolescence. When an adult is baptized, the sacrament is conferred immediately after baptism in the same ceremony. Among those Christians who practice teen-aged confirmation, the practice may be perceived, secondarily, as a "coming of age" rite.

In many Protestant denominations, such as the Anglican, Lutheran, Methodist and Reformed traditions, confirmation is a rite that often includes a profession of faith by an already baptized person. Confirmation is required by Lutherans, Anglicans and other traditional Protestant denominations for full membership in the respective church. In Catholic theology, by contrast, it is the sacrament of baptism that confers membership, while "reception of the sacrament of Confirmation is necessary for the completion of baptismal grace". The Catholic and Methodist denominations teach that in confirmation, the Holy Spirit strengthens a baptized individual for their faith journey.

Confirmation is not practiced in Baptist, Anabaptist and other groups that teach believer's baptism. Thus, the sacrament or rite of confirmation is administered to those being received from those aforementioned groups, in addition to those converts from non-Christian religions. The Church of Jesus Christ of Latter-day Saints does not practice infant baptism, but individuals can be baptized after they reach the "age of accountability". Confirmation in the LDS Church occurs shortly following baptism, which is not considered complete or fully efficacious until confirmation is received.

There is an analogous ceremony also called confirmation in Reform Judaism.

Scriptural foundation
The roots of confirmation are found in the Church of the New Testament. In the Gospel of John 14, Christ speaks of the coming of the Holy Spirit on the Apostles. Later, after his Resurrection, Jesus breathed upon them and they received the Holy Spirit, a process completed on the day of Pentecost. That Pentecostal outpouring of the Spirit was the sign of the messianic age foretold by the prophets (cf. Ezek 36:25–27; Joel 3:1–2). Its arrival was proclaimed by Apostle Peter. Filled with the Holy Spirit the apostles began to proclaim "the mighty works of God" (Acts 2:11; Cf. 2:17–18). After this point, the New Testament records the apostles bestowing the Holy Spirit upon others through the laying on of hands.

Three texts make it certain that a laying on of hands for the imparting of the Spirit – performed after the water-bath and as a complement to this bath – existed already in the earliest apostolic times. These texts are: Acts 8:4–20 and 19:1–7, and Hebrews 6:1–6. 
In the Acts of the Apostles 8:14–17 different "ministers" are named for the two actions.  It is not deacon Philip, the baptiser, but only the apostles who were able to impart the pneuma through the laying on of hands.

Now when the apostles in Jerusalem heard that Samaria had accepted the word of God, they sent them Peter and John, who went down and prayed for them, that they might receive the holy Spirit, for it had not yet fallen upon any of them; they had only been baptized in the name of the Lord Jesus. Then they laid hands on them and they received the holy Spirit.
Further on in the text, connection between the gift of the Holy Spirit and the gesture of laying on of hands appears even more clearly. Acts 8:18–19 introduces the request of Simon the magician in the following way: "When Simon saw that the Spirit was given through the laying on of the apostles' hands ... ."
In Acts 19, baptism of the disciples is mentioned in quite general terms, without the minister being identified. If we refer to 1 Cor 1:17 we may presume that Paul left the action of baptising to others. But then Acts 19:6 expressly states that it was Apostle Paul who laid his hands upon the newly baptised. 
Hebrews 6:1–6 distinguishes "the teaching about baptisms" from the teaching about "the laying on of hands". The difference may be understood in the light of the two passages in Acts 8 and 19.

Christian denominational views

Roman Catholic Church

In the teaching of the Roman Catholic Church, confirmation, known also as chrismation, is one of the seven sacraments instituted by Christ for the conferral of sanctifying grace and the strengthening of the union between the individual and God.

The Catechism of the Catholic Church in its paragraphs 1302–1303 states:

In the Latin (i.e., Western) Catholic Church, the sacrament is customarily conferred only on persons old enough to understand it, and the ordinary minister of confirmation is a bishop. "If necessity so requires", the diocesan bishop may grant specified priests the faculty to administer the sacrament, although normally he is to administer it himself or ensure that it is conferred by another bishop. In addition, the law itself confers the same faculty on the following:
within the confines of their jurisdiction, those who in law are equivalent to a diocesan Bishop (for example, a vicar apostolic);
in respect of the person to be confirmed, the priest who by virtue of his office or by mandate of the diocesan Bishop baptises an adult or admits a baptized adult into full communion with the Catholic Church;
in respect of those in danger of death, the parish priest or indeed any priest.

"According to the ancient practice maintained in the Roman liturgy, an adult is not to be baptized unless he receives Confirmation immediately afterward, provided no serious obstacles exist." Administration of the two sacraments, one immediately after the other, to adults is normally done by the bishop of the diocese (generally at the Easter Vigil) since "the baptism of adults, at least of those who have completed their fourteenth year, is to be referred to the Bishop, so that he himself may confer it if he judges this appropriate" But if the bishop does not confer the baptism, then it devolves on the priest whose office it then is to confer both sacraments, since, "in addition to the bishop, the law gives the faculty to confirm to the following, ... priests who, in virtue of an office which they lawfully hold, baptize an adult or a child old enough for catechesis or receive a validly baptized adult into full communion with the Church."

In Eastern Catholic Churches, the usual minister of this sacrament is the parish priest, using olive oil consecrated by a bishop (i.e., chrism) and administering the sacrament immediately after baptism. This corresponds exactly to the practice of the early Church, when at first those receiving baptism were mainly adults, and of the non-Roman Catholic Eastern Churches.

The practice of the Eastern Churches gives greater emphasis to the unity of Christian initiation. That of the Latin Church more clearly expresses the communion of the new Christian with the bishop as guarantor and servant of the unity, catholicity and apostolicity of his Church, and hence the connection with the apostolic origins of Christ's Church.

Rite of Confirmation in the West
The main reason why the West separated the sacrament of confirmation from that of baptism was to re-establish direct contact between the person being initiated with the bishops. In the Early Church, the bishop administered all three sacraments of initiation (baptism, confirmation and Eucharist), assisted by the priests and deacons and, where they existed, by deaconesses for women's baptism. The post-baptismal Chrismation in particular was reserved to the bishop. When adults no longer formed the majority of those being baptized, this Chrismation was delayed until the bishop could confer it. Until the 12th century, priests often continued to confer confirmation before giving Communion to very young children.

After the Fourth Lateran Council, Communion, which continued to be given only after confirmation, was to be administered only on reaching the age of reason. Some time after the 13th century, the age of confirmation and Communion began to be delayed further, from seven, to twelve and to fifteen. In the 18th c. in France the sequence of sacraments of initiation was changed. Bishops started to impart confirmation only after the first Eucharistic communion. The reason was no longer the busy calendar of the bishop, but the bishop's will to give adequate instruction to the youth. The practice lasted until Pope Leo XIII in 1897 asked to restore the primary order and to celebrate confirmation back at the age of reason. That didn't last long. In 1910 his successor, Pope Pius X, showing concern for the easy access to the Eucharist for children, in his Letter  lowered the age of first communion to seven.

The 1917 Code of Canon Law, while recommending that confirmation be delayed until about seven years of age, allowed it be given at an earlier age. Only on 30 June 1932 was official permission given to change the traditional order of the three sacraments of Christian initiation: the Sacred Congregation for the Sacraments then allowed, where necessary, that confirmation be administered after first Holy Communion. This novelty, originally seen as exceptional, became more and more the accepted practice. Thus, in the mid-20th century, confirmation began to be seen as an occasion for professing personal commitment to the faith on the part of someone approaching adulthood.

However, the Catechism of the Catholic Church (1308) warns: "Although Confirmation is sometimes called the 'sacrament of Christian maturity,' we must not confuse adult faith with the adult age of natural growth, nor forget that the baptismal grace is a grace of free, unmerited election and does not need 'ratification' to become effective."

On the canonical age for confirmation in the Latin or Western Catholic Church, the present (1983) Code of Canon Law, which maintains unaltered the rule in the 1917 Code, lays down that the sacrament is to be conferred on the faithful at about the age of discretion (generally taken to be about 7), unless the Episcopal Conference has decided on a different age, or there is a danger of death or, in the judgement of the minister, a grave reason suggests otherwise (canon 891 of the Code of Canon Law). The Code prescribes the age of discretion also for the sacraments of Reconciliation and first Holy Communion.

In some places the setting of a later age, e.g. mid-teens in the United States, early teens in Ireland and Britain, has been abandoned in recent decades in favor of restoring the traditional order of the three sacraments of Christian initiation, Even where a later age has been set, a bishop may not refuse to confer the sacrament on younger children who request it, provided they are baptized, have the use of reason, are suitably instructed and are properly disposed and able to renew the baptismal promises (letter of the Congregation for Divine Worship and the Discipline of the Sacraments published in its 1999 bulletin, pages 537–540).

Effects of confirmation
The Roman Catholic Church and some Anglo-Catholics teach that, like baptism, confirmation marks the recipient permanently, making it impossible to receive the sacrament twice. It accepts as valid a confirmation conferred within churches, such as the Eastern Orthodox Church, whose Holy Orders it sees as valid through the apostolic succession of their bishops. But it considers it necessary to administer the sacrament of confirmation, in its view for the only time, to Protestants who are admitted to full communion with the Catholic Church.

One of the effects of the sacrament is that "it gives us a special strength of the Holy Spirit to spread and defend the faith by word and action as true witnesses of Christ, to confess the name of Christ boldly, and never to be ashamed of the Cross" (Catechism of the Catholic Church, 1303). This effect was described by the Council of Trent as making the confirmed person "a soldier of Christ".

The same passage of the Catechism of the Catholic Church also mentions, as an effect of confirmation, that "it renders our bond with the Church more perfect". This mention stresses the importance of participation in the Christian community.

The "soldier of Christ" imagery was used, as far back as 350, by St Cyril of Jerusalem. In this connection, the touch on the cheek that the bishop gave while saying "" (Peace be with you) to the person he had just confirmed was interpreted in the Roman Pontifical as a slap, a reminder to be brave in spreading and defending the faith: "" (Then he strikes him lightly on the cheek, saying: Peace be with you). When, in application of the Second Vatican Council's Constitution on the Sacred Liturgy, the confirmation rite was revised in 1971, mention of this gesture was omitted. However, the French and Italian translations, indicating that the bishop should accompany the words "Peace be with you" with "a friendly gesture" (French text) or "the sign of peace" (Italian text), explicitly allow a gesture such as the touch on the cheek, to which they restore its original meaning. This is in accord with the Introduction to the rite of confirmation, 17, which indicates that the episcopal conference may decide "to introduce a different manner for the minister to give the sign of peace after the anointing, either to each individual or to all the newly confirmed together."

Eastern Churches

Eastern Christians link chrismation closely with the sacred mystery of baptism, conferring it immediately after baptism, which is normally on infants.

The sacred tradition of the Orthodox Church teaches that the Apostles themselves established the practice of anointing with chrism (consecrated oil) in place of the laying on of hands when bestowing the sacrament. As the numbers of converts grew, it became physically impossible for the apostles to lay hands upon each of the newly baptized. So the Apostles laid hands upon a vessel of oil, bestowing the Holy Spirit upon it, which was then distributed to all of the presbyters (priests) for their use when they baptized. This same chrism is in use to this day, never being completely depleted but newly consecrated chrism only being added to it as needed (this consecration traditionally is performed only by the primates of certain autocephalous churches on Great Thursday) and it is believed that chrism in use today contains some small amount of the original chrism made by the apostles.

When Roman Catholics and traditional Protestants, such as Lutherans, Anglicans and Methodists, convert to Orthodoxy, they are often admitted by chrismation, without baptism; but, since this is a matter of local episcopal discretion, a bishop may require all converts to be admitted by baptism if he deems it necessary. Depending upon the form of the original baptism, some Protestants must be baptized upon conversion to Orthodoxy. A common practice is that those persons who have been previously baptized by triple immersion in the name of the Trinity do not need to be baptized. However, requirements will differ from jurisdiction to jurisdiction and some traditional Orthodox jurisdictions prefer to baptize all converts. When a person is received into the church, whether by baptism or chrismation, they will often take the name of a saint, who will become their patron saint. Thenceforward, the feast day of that saint will be celebrated as the convert's name day, which in traditional Orthodox cultures is celebrated in lieu of one's birthday.

The Orthodox rite of chrismation takes place immediately after baptism and clothing the "newly illumined" (i.e., newly baptized) in their baptismal robe. The priest makes the sign of the cross with the chrism (also referred to as myrrh) on the brow, eyes, nostrils, lips, both ears, breast, hands and feet of the newly illumined, saying with each anointing: "The seal of the gift of the Holy Spirit. Amen." Then the priest will place his epitrachelion (stole) over the newly illumined and leads them and their sponsors in a procession, circling three times around the Gospel Book, while the choir chants each time: "As many as have been baptized into Christ have put on Christ. Alleluia".

The reason the Eastern Churches perform chrismation immediately after baptism is so that the newly baptized may receive Holy Communion, which is commonly given to infants as well as adults.

An individual may be baptized in extremis (in a life-threatening emergency) by any baptized member of the church; however, only a priest or bishop may perform the mystery of chrismation. If someone who has been baptized in extremis survives, the priest then performs the chrismation.

The Roman Catholic Church does not confirm converts to Catholicism who have been chrismated in a non-Catholic Eastern church, considering that the sacrament has been validly conferred and may not be repeated.
 
In the Eastern Orthodox Church the sacrament may be conferred more than once and it is customary to receive returning or repentant apostates by repeating chrismation.

The Church of Jesus Christ of Latter-day Saints
When discussing confirmation, The Church of Jesus Christ of Latter-day Saints (LDS Church) uses the term "ordinance" owing to their origins in a Protestant environment, but the actual doctrine describing their ordinances and their effects is sacramental. Church ordinances are understood as administering grace and must be conducted by properly ordained clergy members through apostolic succession reaching back through Peter to Christ, although the line of authority differs from Catholics and Eastern Orthodox. Baptism by water is understood as representing the death of the old person and their resurrection from that death into a new life in Christ. Through baptism by water, sin, and guilt are washed away as the old sinner dies and the new child of Christ emerges. Confirmation is understood as being the baptism by fire wherein the Holy Spirit enters into the individual, purges them of the effects of the sin from their previous life (the guilt and culpability of which were already washed away), and introduces them into the church as a new person in Christ. Through confirmation, the individual receives the Gift of the Holy Ghost, granting the individual the permanent companionship of the Holy Ghost as long as the person does not willfully drive Him away through sin.

The ceremony is significantly simpler than in Catholic or Eastern Orthodox churches and is performed by an ordained clergyman as follows:

 Lays his hands upon the individual's head and states the person's full name.
 States that the ordinance is performed by the authority of the Melchizedek Priesthood.
 Confirms the person a member of the LDS Church.
 Bestows the gift of the Holy Ghost by saying, "Receive the Holy Ghost."
 Gives a priesthood blessing as the Spirit directs.
 Closes in the name of Jesus Christ.

Other actions typically associated with confirmation in Catholicism or Eastern Orthodoxy, such as the reception of a Christian name, anointing of body parts with chrism, and the clothing of the confirmant in a white garment or chiton are conducted separately as part of a ceremony called the Initiatory.

Lutheran Churches

Lutheran confirmation is a public profession of faith prepared for by long and careful instruction. In English, it is called "affirmation of baptism", and is a mature and public profession of the faith which "marks the completion of the congregation's program of confirmation ministry". The German language also uses for Lutheran confirmation a different word from the word used for the sacramental rite of the Catholic Church.

Lutheran churches do not treat confirmation as a dominical sacrament of the Gospel, considering that only baptism and the Eucharist can be regarded as such. Some popular Sundays for this to occur are Palm Sunday, Pentecost and Reformation Sunday (last Sunday in October).

Anglican Communion

Article 25 of The 16th Century 39 Articles lists confirmation among those rites "commonly called Sacraments" which are "not to be counted for Sacraments of the Gospel" (a term referring to the dominical sacraments, i.e. baptism and the Holy Eucharist), because they were not directly instituted by Christ with a specific matter and form, and they are not generally necessary to salvation. The language of the Articles has led some to deny that confirmation and the other rites are sacraments at all. Others maintain that "commonly called Sacraments" does not mean "wrongly called Sacraments".

Many Anglicans, especially Anglo-Catholics, count the rite as one of seven sacraments. This is the official view in several Anglican provinces. While most provinces of the Anglican Communion do not make provision for ministers other than bishops to administer confirmation, presbyters can be authorized to do so in certain South Asian provinces, which are united churches. Similarly, the American Episcopal Church recognizes that "those who have previously made a mature public commitment in another Church may be received by the laying on of hands by a Bishop of this Church, rather than confirmed." Furthermore, at its General Convention in 2015 a resolution advancing presbyteral confirmation was referred to committee for further review.

"[T]he renewal of the baptismal vows, which is part of the Anglican Confirmation service, is in no way necessary to Confirmation and can be done more than once. [...] When Confirmation is given early, candidates may be asked to make a fresh renewal of vows when they approach adult life at about eighteen." The 1662 Book of Common Prayer of the Church of England employs the phrase "ratify and confirm" with respect to these vows which has led to the common conception of confirmation as the renewal of baptismal vows. While such a view closely aligns to the doctrine of confirmation held by Lutherans, the dominant Anglican position is perhaps better evidenced in the attempt to replace "ratify and confirm" with "ratify and confess" in the proposed 1928 prayer book, which was defeated in the House of Commons 14 June of that year. Anglicanism includes a range of approaches to the theology of confirmation.

Methodist Churches
In the Methodist Church, as with the Anglican Communion, Confirmation is defined by the Articles of Religion as one those "Commonly called Sacraments but not to be counted for Sacraments of the Gospel", also known as the "five lesser sacraments". The Methodist theologian John William Fletcher stated that "it was a custom of the Apostles and elders in the primitive Church, adopted by our own church, to pray that young Believers might be filled with the Spirit through the laying on of hands." As such, the Methodist Worship Book declares that

By Water and Spirit, an official United Methodist publication, states that "it should be emphasized that Confirmation is what the Holy Spirit does. Confirmation is a divine action, the work of the Spirit empowering a person 'born through water and the Spirit' to 'live as a faithful disciple of Jesus Christ'." As with its Anglican patrimony, in Methodism, confirmation is a means of grace. Furthermore, confirmation is the individual's first public affirmation of the grace of God in baptism and the acknowledgment of the acceptance of that grace by faith. For those baptized as infants, it often occurs when youth enter their 6th through 8th grade years, but it may occur earlier or later. For youth and adults who are joining the Church, "those who are baptized are also confirmed, remembering that our ritual reflects the ancient unity of baptism, confirmation (laying on of hands with prayer), and Eucharist." Candidates to be confirmed, known as confirmands, take a class which covers Christian doctrine, theology, Methodist Church history, stewardship, basic Bible study and other topics.

Presbyterian, Congregationalist and Continental Reformed Churches
The Presbyterian Church in America has a process of confirmation, but it is not necessarily public, and depends on the congregation as to the nature of confirmation. In practice, many churches do require and offer classes for Confirmation.

The PC(USA) has a confirmation process. This is a profession of faith that "seeks to provide youth with a foundational understanding of our faith, tradition and Presbyterian practices".

Irvingian Churches
In the New Apostolic Church, the largest of the Irvingian denominations, Confirmation is a rite that "strengthens the confirmands in their endeavour to keep their vow to profess Jesus Christ in word and deed." Confirmation is celebrated within the Divine Service and in it, confirmands take the following vow:

Following the recitation of the vow, "young Christians receive the confirmation blessing, which is dispensed upon them through laying on of hands."

United Protestant Churches
In United Protestant Churches, such as the United Church of Canada, Church of North India, Church of Pakistan, Church of South India, Uniting Church in Australia and United Church of Christ in Japan, confirmation is a rite that is "understood as a Christian person assuming the responsibilities of the promises made at baptism."

Confirmation name
In many countries, it is customary for a person being confirmed in some dioceses of Roman Catholic Church and in parts of Lutheranism and Anglicanism to adopt a new name, generally the name of a biblical character or saint, thus securing an additional patron saint as protector and guide. This practice is not mentioned in the official liturgical book of the rite of confirmation and is not in use in Spanish and French-speaking lands, nor in Italy or the Philippines. Although some insist on the custom, it is discouraged by others and in any case is only a secondary aspect of confirmation.

As indicated by the different senses of the word "christening", baptism and the giving of a personal name have traditionally been linked. At confirmation, in which the intervention of a godparent strengthens a resemblance with baptism, it became customary to take a new name, as was also the custom on other occasions, in particular that of religious profession. King Henry III of France (1551–1589) was christened Edouard Alexandre in 1551, but at confirmation received the name Henri, by which he afterwards reigned. Today usually no great use is made of the confirmation name, although some treat it as an additional middle name. For example, A Song of Ice and Fire author George R. R. Martin was born George Raymond Martin, but added his confirmation name Richard as a second middle name. However, even after the English Reformation, the legal system of that country admitted the lawfulness of using one's confirmation name in, for instance, purchasing land.

Repetition of the sacrament or rite
The Catholic Church sees confirmation as one of the three sacraments that no one can receive more than once (see sacramental character). It recognizes as already confirmed those who enter the Catholic Church after receiving the sacrament, even as babies, in the churches of Eastern Christianity, but it confers the sacrament (in its view, for the first and only time) on those who enter the Catholic Church after being confirmed in Protestant churches, seeing these churches as lacking properly ordained ministers.

In the Lutheran Churches, those individuals who received the sacrament of baptism according to the Trinitarian formula in a non-Lutheran church are confirmed as Lutherans, ordinarily during the Easter Vigil—the first liturgy of Eastertide. The rite of confirmation is preceded by a period of catechetical instruction.

In the Anglican Communion, a person who was previously confirmed in another denomination by a bishop or priest recognized as validly ordained is "received" rather than confirmed again. Some dioceses of the Protestant Episcopal Church in the United States of America recognize non-episcopal Confirmations as well and these individuals are received into the Anglican Communion rather than re-confirmed. In other dioceses, confirmations of those Christian denominations are recognized if they have a valid apostolic succession in the eyes of the Anglican Communion (e.g. Evangelical Lutheran Church in America, Roman Catholic Church, etc.).

Eastern Orthodox churches occasionally practise what is seen by other Christians as "re-Chrismation", in that they usually chrismate/confirm – and sometimes rebaptize – a convert, even one previously confirmed in other churches. The justification is that the new Chrismation (or baptism) is the only valid one, the earlier one being administered outside of the Church and hence being little more than a symbol. The Eastern Orthodox will also chrismate an apostate from the Orthodox Church who repents and re-enters communion. According to some interpretations, the Eastern churches therefore view confirmation/Chrismation as a repeatable sacrament. According to others, the rite is understood as "part of a process of reconciliation, rather than as a reiteration of post-baptismal chrismation".

Analogous ceremonies in non-Christian practice

Judaism

In the 1800s Reform Judaism developed a separate ceremony, called confirmation, loosely modeled on Christian Confirmation ceremonies. This occurred because, at the time, Reform Jews believed that it was inappropriate for bar/bat mitzvah age children to be considered mature enough to understand what it means to be religious. It was held that children of this age were not responsible enough to understand what it means to observe religious practices. Israel Jacobson developed the confirmation ceremony to replace bar/bat mitzvah. Originally this ceremony was for 13-year-old boys. In later decades, the Reform movement modified this view, and now much of Reform Judaism in the United States encourages children to celebrate becoming Bar/Bat mitzvah at the traditional age, and then has the confirmation at the later age as a sign of a more advanced completion of their Jewish studies.

Today, many Reform Jewish congregations hold confirmation ceremonies as a way of marking the biblical festival of Shavuot and the decision of young adults to embrace Jewish study in their lives and reaffirm their commitment to the Covenant. The confirmands represent "the first fruits of each year's harvest.  They represent the hope and promise of tomorrow." Confirmation is typically held in tenth grade after a year of study, but some synagogues celebrate it in other years of high school.

Confirmation, in the context of Reform Judaism, was mentioned officially for the first time in an ordinance issued by the Jewish consistory of the kingdom of Westphalia at Cassel in 1810. There it was made the duty of the rabbi "to prepare the young for confirmation, and personally to conduct the ceremony." At first only boys were confirmed, on the Sabbath ("Shabbat") that they celebrated becoming Bar Mitzvah; the ceremony was performed at the home or in the schoolroom. In Berlin, Jewish girls were confirmed for the first time in 1817, in Hamburg in 1818.

Confirmation was at first excluded from the synagogue, because, like every innovation, it met with stern opposition from more traditional rabbis. Gradually, however, it found more favor; Hebrew school classes were confirmed together, and confirmation gradually became a solemn celebration at the synagogue. In 1822 the first class of boys and girls was confirmed at the Hamburg Temple, and in 1831 Rabbi Samuel Egers, a prominent traditional rabbi of his time, began to confirm boys and girls at the synagogue of Brunswick. While in the beginning some Shabbat, frequently during Chanukah or Passover, was selected for confirmation, it became increasingly customary, following the example of Egers, to perform the ceremony during the biblical festival of Shavuot ("Feast of Weeks").  It was felt that Shavuot was well suited for the rite, as it celebrated the occasion when the Israelites on Mount Sinai declared their intention to accept the yoke of God's Law, so those of every new generation should follow the ancient example and declare their willingness to be faithful to the Sinaitic covenant transmitted by their ancestors.

Confirmation was introduced in Denmark as early as 1817, in Hamburg 1818, and in Hessen and Saxony in 1835. The Prussian government, which showed itself hostile to the Reform movement, prohibited it as late as 1836, as did Bavaria as late as 1838. It soon made its way, however, into all progressive congregations of Germany. In 1841 it was introduced in France, first in Bordeaux and Marseilles, then in Strasburg and Paris, under the name . The first Israelitish synod in 1869 at Leipsic adopted a report on religious education, the 13th section of which contains an elaborate opinion on confirmation, recommending the same to all Jewish congregations. In America the annual confirmation of boys and girls was first resolved upon by the congregation of Temple Emanu-El of New York in 1847. The ceremony soon gained so firm a foothold in America that soon there was no progressive Jewish congregation in which it did not occur during Shavuot.

Secular confirmations 

Several secular, mainly Humanist, organizations direct civil confirmations for older children, as a statement of their life stance that is an alternative to traditional religious ceremonies for children of that age.

Some atheist regimes have as a matter of policy fostered the replacement of Christian rituals such as confirmation with non-religious ones. In the historically Protestant German Democratic Republic (East Germany), for example, "the Jugendweihe (youth dedication) gradually supplanted the Christian practice of Confirmation."

See also

 Rite of passage

References

Further reading

External links
The Rite of Confirmation Resource Site
 Waking Up Catholic – RCIA and Adult Confirmation 
  Church Fathers on Confirmation
Catholic Sacrament of Confirmation – Initiation
 Information and Forum for Roman Catholics About to Receive0 Confirmation
 Catholic Encyclopedia – Catholic teaching on Confirmation
 Catechism of Filaret, 307–314 – Eastern Orthodox teaching on Confirmation/Unction with Chrism/Chrismation
 Anglican teaching on Confirmation
 Judaism 101: Bar Mitzvah, Bat Mitzvah, and Confirmation
 My Jewish Learning: Jewish Confirmation

Sacraments
Latter Day Saint ordinances, rituals, and symbolism
Rites of passage
Holy Spirit